Frederick Gill Haslam (6 January 1899–1971) was an English footballer who played in the Football League for Stockport County.

References

1899 births
1971 deaths
English footballers
Association football forwards
English Football League players
Lytham F.C. players
Stockport County F.C. players
Chorley F.C. players